The 1948 United States presidential election in Maine took place on November 2, 1948, as part of the 1948 United States presidential election. State voters chose five electors to the Electoral College, which selected the president and vice president.

Maine was won by Republican candidate New York governor Thomas E. Dewey over Democratic candidate, incumbent President Harry S. Truman.

Dewey won Maine by a margin of 14.47%. With 56.74% of the popular vote, it would be his second strongest state after nearby Vermont.

Results

Results by county

See also
 United States presidential elections in Maine

References

1948
Maine
1948 Maine elections